is a Japanese actor who is represented by the talent agency Knockout.

Biography
Emoto's father is Akira Emoto, his mother is Kazue Tsunogae, and his brother is Tasuku Emoto. He is left-handed.

In 2003, Emoto had his acting debut in the film, Jam Films S.

Up until around 2011, he maintained a part-time job in Shimokitazawa while acting. As of July 2015, his job was in a T-shirt shop.

Filmography

TV series

Films

Japanese dub

References

External links
Official profile 

Japanese male actors
1989 births
Living people
People from Tokyo